Florentino is both a masculine given name and a surname. Notable people with the name include:

People with the given name
Florentino Alfaro Zamora (died 1871), Costa Rican politician
Florentino Álvarez Mesa (1846–1926), Spanish journalist, writer and politician
Florentino Ameghino (1853–1911), Argentine naturalist, paleontologist, anthropologist and zoologist
Florentino Asensio Barroso (1877–1936), Spanish Roman Catholic bishop
Florentino Ávidos (1870–1956), Brazilian politician
Florentino Bautista (born 1930), Filipino basketball player
Florentino Broce (c. 1943 – 2015), Filipino footballer and manager
Florentino Castro López (born 1949), Mexican politician
Florentino Collantes (1896–1951), Filipino poet
Florentino Das (1918–1964), Filipino sailor
Florentino Domínguez Ordoñez (born 1962), Mexican politician
Florentino Fernández (actor) (born 1972), Spanish actor and comedian
Florentino Fernández (boxer) (1936–2013), Cuban boxer
Florentino Floro (born 1953), Filipino judge
Florentino García Martínez (born 1942), Spanish Roman Catholic priest and theologian
Florentino Goikoetxea (1898–1980)
Florentino Jimón Barba, Mexican potter
Florentino Lavarias (born 1957), Filipino Roman Catholic bishop
Florentino López Cuevillas (1886–1958), Spanish anthropologist and prehistorian
Florentino Luís (born 1999), Portuguese footballer
Florentino Martínez (born 1944), Mexican sport wrestler
Florentino Molina (born 1938), Argentine golfer
Florentino Peñaranda (1876–1938), Filipino educator and politician
Florentino Pérez (born 1947), Spanish businessman, civil engineer, politician and president of Real Madrid
Florentino Rodao (born 1960), Spanish historian and Japanologist
Florentino Suico (1902–1981), Filipino writer and poet
Florentino Tecson (1906–1962), Filipino lawyer, politician, writer and labor leader
Florentino Tirante (born 1961), Filipino sport wrestler
Florentino Torres (1844–1927), Filipino lawyer and judge
Florentino (a character in Arena of Valor).

People with the surname
Gisele Florentino (born 1973), Brazilian volleyball player
Leona Florentino (1849–1884), Filipino poet
Pedro Florentino, 19th-century Dominican Republic military officer

Masculine given names